Edward Joseph Flanigan (October 19, 1874 – December 13, 1932) was a justice of the Supreme Court of Arizona from September 28, 1921 to January 1, 1923. Flanigan served as deputy district attorney for Cochise County.

Flanigan ran as the Republican nominee for Supreme Court Justice in 1920 and lost against Democratic incumbent Archibald G. McAlister. Governor Thomas Edward Campbell then appointed Flanigan to fill the vacancy caused by the death of Justice Albert C. Baker.  Flanigan did not run for re-election and Frank H. Lyman won the 1922 election unopposed. He died in a traffic collision in 1932.

References

Justices of the Arizona Supreme Court
1874 births
1932 deaths